The Wonderful Story is a 1922 British drama film directed by Graham Cutts and starring Lillian Hall-Davis, Herbert Langley and Olaf Hytten.

It was based on the short shory of the same name by I. A. R. Wylie, which was originally published in the January 1921 issue of Nash's and Pall Mall Magazine.

Plot
The fiancée of a farmer falls in love with his brother.

Production
Herbert Wilcox had a lot of success distributing a British film, A Peep Behind the Scenes (1919) and decided to produce a British film himself.  He raised £1,400 and picked The Wonderful Story because he believed as it was homely and had few characters it would be suited for the cinema. The film was made on budget of £1,400 and Wilcox sold the rights to it for £4,000. Despite being acclaimed by the critics it was considered a failure at the box office.

Cast
 Lillian Hall-Davis – Kate Richards
 Herbert Langley – Robert Martin
 Olaf Hytten – Jimmy Martin
 Bernard Vaughan – Vicar

References

Bibliography
 Low, Rachel. The History of British Film: Volume IV, 1918–1929. Routledge, 1997.

External links

1922 films
1922 drama films
Films directed by Graham Cutts
British drama films
British silent short films
Films set in England
British black-and-white films
Films based on works by I. A. R. Wylie
1920s English-language films
1920s British films
Silent drama films